The Silver State Classic Challenge is an authorized Open Road Racing event that is run since 1988 on a  stretch of State Route 318 in Nevada, United States, which is closed for the occasion.

It is called the fastest road race in the world by Guinness, It was the venue for the highest speed achieved in an open road race, when Charles "Chuck" Shafer and Gary Bockman averaged  in 2017, in a 2001 Chevrolet Monte Carlo stock car, as used in NASCAR. These cars run the gamut from sports cars such as Corvettes and Mustangs to sedans such as Nissan Skylines, Mercedes wagons, and even Saturns.

History
Conceived by Steve Waldman, the event was first run on September 25, 1988, primarily as a showcase for vintage cars. With the assistance of the White Pine Chamber of Commerce and the Nevada Department of Transportation, a  stretch of State Route 318 was closed for the day, and approximately fifty cars took part. This run was well documented in a Hot Rod article that year. In the years that followed, the organization became increasingly professional, with rules for safety, car preparation and driver experience becoming more stringent.

An additional event has been run each May since 1991, called the Nevada Open Road Challenge. This follows the same format and rules as the Silver State Classic Challenge, but cooler weather can lead to higher speeds for the fastest cars.

Rules and Speed Classes
Drivers and optional navigators compete to set a specified average speed ("Target Speed") over the  course. The start and finish time for each car is recorded against a GPS clock, and the average speed is calculated from the elapsed time. In each speed class, the winners are driver and navigator to achieve the speed closest to their target speed.

The classes specify safety equipment levels required for cars, drivers and navigators, and a maximum "Tech Speed", which may never be exceeded. Radar traps are hidden along the course to enforce this rule. There is also an Unlimited Class, in which drivers compete to set the fastest possible time over the course, with no maximum speed restrictions.

Touring Class (Speed classes: 95, 100, 105, 110 mph)
Stock street cars with regular 3-point seatbelts may be run in this class. A handheld fire extinguisher must be fitted, while gloves and Snell approved motorsports helmets must be worn by drivers and navigators. First-time drivers must run in this class unless they have appropriate motorsports experience.

Grand Touring Class (Speed classes: 115, 120, 125 mph)
In addition to a handheld fire extinguisher, gloves and Snell helmets, the car must be fitted with 5-point or 6-point harnesses and (from 2007) window nets or arm restraints for the driver and navigator (if present). Open cars must have a rollbar fitted.

Grand Sport Class (Speed classes: 130, 135, 140, 145, 150 mph)
In addition to the above equipment, all cars must be fitted with a rollbar or equivalent roll-over protection. Drivers and navigators must wear fireproof racing suits.

Super Sport Class (Speed classes: 160, 170, 180 mph, and Unlimited)
In this class, specialist race cars are necessary. A full roll cage, fuel cell and onboard plumbed fire extinguisher are required.

Other events
Over the weekend, there are also two drag events on a local stretch of closed-off highway. This is an unusual event, in that the  altitude of Ely significantly reduces engine power, so the results are slower than similar events at lower altitude.

On Friday, the Z1Z/Z2Z challenge is held. Classes are determined by engine size and engine aspiration method.

On Saturday, the High Noon Shootout takes place. This is a pure speed event, in which Touring and Grand Touring cars have half a mile to accelerate to the highest possible speed, while Grand Sports cars and above have a one-mile (1.6 km) straight. However, the car was severely damaged in an incident on a subsequent run.

Safety
Due to the lack of crash barriers, spectators are not permitted. The only way to watch the race is as one of the safety marshals who man every gate along the course.

There were two fatalities in the first decade of the Silver State Classic Challenge, five altogether with the most recent in 2014. In recent years, much more stringent safety rules have been enforced, with a particularly strong emphasis on the speed and load capacity of the tires. During 2003, a number of drivers questioned the effectiveness of the radio system used by course marshals to monitor cars and (if necessary) to call for medical assistance. This has been addressed through an improved radio communication system, including the loan of a basic 2-way radio to each competitor.

Management
The president and chairman of the Silver State Classic Challenge is Steve Waldman, who is also a regular participant in a Dodge Viper and other vehicles. Mr. Waldman was involved in the setting up of the Silver State Classic Challenge from the beginning. The Silver State Classic Challenge awards banquet and hotel sponsor was originally the Showboat Hotel & Casino, where Mr. Waldman was Vice-President of Marketing for the hotel chain. The Silver State Classic Challenge awards banquet and hotel sponsor is now the Sam's Town Hotel & Casino. The Silver State Classic Challenge has an appointed board of directors, as well as a number of corporate officers with responsibilities ranging from finance to rookie liaison.

Notable participants

One of the event's participants is the Japanese car magazine Option founder Daijiro Inada, a renowned figure in the import, and drifting scene. The video magazine spinoff, Video Option, recorded his attempts at the event in 1999 and from 2003 to 2006. Due to driver error and equipment problems, the 2004 run was the only one he has so far completed successfully. His current car, the Option Stream Z, is an unlimited category Nissan 350Z.

Another high-profile participant, who has had more success, is former The Dukes of Hazzard star John Schneider, who has competed on several occasions in the General Lee.

Jeff Allen, star of CNBC's The Car Chasers and iTunes Skidmarks Show attended in both 2015 and 2016 with his custom build GTR #Pennzilla winning the 2016 "Hooker Award", 2016 "Most Beautiful Car", "Fastest Car" in the Half mile shootout and 4th in the Open Road Challenge.

Jeff Schwartz, protouring car builder and chassis designer, won the 2006 Silver State Classic Challenge 0-200 mph-0 (Z2Z) in his homebuilt Ultima GTR,   set a record for fastest 0-100-0  and was runner up in the 2007 Silver State Classic 0-200-0.

Guy Martin's appearance in the 2016 Open Road Challenge with his Ford Transit was a subject of his television documentary series Speed with Guy Martin.

Notable cars

Big Red Camaro
"Big Red" is one of the early true pro-touring muscle cars, the first Silver State Classic Unlimited-class record holder. The car was built in 1987 by R. J. and Dan Gottlieb and crew using a 1969 Chevrolet Camaro for the main platform. The power came from a 540 c.i. Lingenfelter-built, aluminum Donovan big-block Chevrolet V8 making 750 lb-ft of torque and 800 horsepower.  R. J. and crew went on to set the record for the Unlimited class of 197.99 mph (318.63 km/h). The original car was destroyed in an accident in the La Carrera road race as the chassis proved unable to handle the high power output.  The second car was designed and built by Bill Osborne with a spaceframe tube chassis. Big Red was retired to a car museum in Laughlin, Nevada in 1996, and was revived for racing again in 2004 with a complete overhaul and restoration of the entire car.

Similar events
Two other Open Road Racing events happen annually in the U.S. the Big Bend Open Road Racing organization happens in West Texas every April, and the Sandhills Open Road Challenge happens in Arnold, Nebraska every August.

References

External links
Silver State Classic website
Sands Mechanical Museum article about the SSCC
Big Red Camaro Official Website

Auto races in the United States
Motorsport in Nevada
Tourist attractions in White Pine County, Nevada